The Asian Hockey Federation is the governing body for the sport of field hockey in Asia. It now has 33 member associations. It is affiliated to the International Hockey Federation (FIH). The current president is Fumio Ogura and the patron is Al-Sultan Abdullah Sultan Ahmad Shah.

Member associations

  Afghanistan
  Bangladesh
  Brunei
  Cambodia
  China
  Chinese Taipei
  Hong Kong
  India
  Indonesia
  Iran
  Japan
  Kazakhstan
  Korea
  Korea (DPR)
  Macau
  Malaysia
  Mongolia
  Myanmar
  Nepal
  Oman
  Pakistan
  Philippines
  Qatar
  Saudi Arabia
  Singapore
  Sri Lanka
  Tajikistan
  Thailand
  Timor-Leste
  Turkmenistan
  United Arab Emirates
  Uzbekistan
  Vietnam

Competitions

Outdoor
 Asian Games
 Men's Hockey Asia Cup
 Women's Hockey Asia Cup
 Men's Asian Champions Trophy
 Women's Asian Champions Trophy
 Men's AHF Cup
 Women's AHF Cup
 Men's Hockey Junior Asia Cup
 Women's Hockey Junior Asia Cup
 Men's Junior AHF Cup
 Women's Junior AHF Cup
 Hockey Asian Champions Club Cup
 AHF Men's Central Asia Cup

Indoor
 Men's Indoor Hockey Asia Cup
 Women's Indoor Hockey Asia Cup
 Indoor Hockey Club Asia Cup

Title holders

National team rankings

References

External links
 
 
 

 
Field hockey
Field hockey
International organisations based in Malaysia